Nicomachus (fl. c. 325 BC) was the son of Aristotle.

Biographical details
The Suda—a massive 10th-century Byzantine encyclopedia of the ancient Mediterranean world—states that Nicomachus was from Stageira, was a philosopher, a pupil of Theophrastus, and, according to Aristippus, his lover. He may have written a commentary on his father's lectures in physics. Nicomachus was born to the slave Herpyllis, and his father's will commended his care as a boy to several tutors, then to his adopted son, Nicanor. Historians think the Nicomachean Ethics, a compilation of Aristotle's lecture notes, was probably named after or dedicated to Aristotle's son. However, Nicomachus is also believed to be the name of Aristotle's father. Several ancient authorities may have conflated Aristotle's ethical works with the commentaries that Nicomachus wrote on them. Ancient sources indicate that Nicomachus died in battle while still a "lad".

References

4th-century BC births
4th-century BC Greek people
4th-century BC philosophers
Classical Greek philosophers
Ancient Stagirites
Peripatetic philosophers
Philosophers of ancient Chalcidice
Year of death unknown